Only Want You may refer to:

 "Only Want You" (Skylar Stecker song), 2017
 "Only Want You" (Rita Ora song), 2019